Saw O (also known as Saw Aw (စောအော); 1284–1323) was king of Martaban from 1311 to 1323. He transformed Martaban into a truly independent kingdom by successfully breaking with its hitherto nominal overlord Sukhothai.

He was put on the throne by his parents Gov. Min Bala of Myaungmya and Princess Hnin U Yaing, who had staged a coup against King Hkun Law. O emerged only after his father's death in the mid-to-late 1310s. He successfully broke with Sukhothai in 1317/18, and went on to capture Lamphun and the Tenasserim coast by 1321.

Early life
Born in 1284, Saw O was the eldest son of Hnin U Yaing and Min Bala. His mother was the sister of Ma Gadu—a commoner who had seized the governorship of Martaban (Mottama) in 1285. O became in a royal in 1287 when his uncle Gadu, styled as King Wareru, successfully declared independence from the Pagan Empire. The young boy's name gained the royal honorific "Saw"—reported as Saw O (စောအို) as well as Saw Aw (စောအော).

The young prince likely moved with his family to Myaungmya, a key port in the Irrawaddy delta, where his father became governor, perhaps in the mid-1290s. Then in 1311, the 26-year-old prince was put on the Martaban throne by his parents.

Reign

Accession
O's parents had been plotting to overthrow King Hkun Law who succeeded Wareru in 1307. In March 1311, Bala and U Yaing staged a palace coup while Law was out on an elephant hunting trip. Bala's troops killed the king upon his return. Bala initially wanted to proclaim himself king. But U Yaing objected, saying that Bala was too old already, and that their eldest son, as nephew of Wareru, would stand a better chance at gaining the support of the vassals. (O had two full younger brothers.) During the deliberations, the throne was vacant for at least two weeks, perhaps even longer. Bala finally yielded to his wife's demand, and O ascended the throne on 10 April 1311.

Early reign
One of the first acts of his reign was to seek recognition from Martaban's overlord Sukhothai. The king of Sukhothai gave him recognition with the title of Saw Thin Maung, and sent his daughter May Hnin Htapi in a marriage of state. (The king of Sukhothai was either Loe Thai or his father King Ram Khamhaeng.)

Still, O was king in name only. His father remained the actual power behind the throne. The Razadarit Ayedawbon chronicle reports that the Lord of Myaungmya managed all affairs related to the kingdom, from his own "palace" at a nearby hill outside Martaban. Bala and U Yaing both died from old age in the mid-to-late 1310s.

Break with Sukhothai
By 1317/18, O had emerged from his father's shadows. With his northern frontier with Pinya quiet, he considered challenging Sukhothai. He broke with his overlord six years into his reign. (Chronicles do not state why O, married to a Siamese princess, suddenly decided to challenge his nominal overlord. According to Cœdès, King Ram Khamhaeng died "shortly before 1318", not 1299 as reported by the Chinese records. If Cœdès's conjecture is correct, O may have decided not to pledge allegiance to Khamhaeng's successor Loe Thai.)

At any rate, he attacked Sukhothai's western vassals, and went on to seize Lamphun region south of Chiang Mai by 1320/21. Emboldened by success, he next targeted Sukhothai's southern possessions on the Tenasserim coast, taking Tavoy (Dawei) and Tenasserim (Taninthayi) in the following dry season. He was so pleased with the victory that he built a palace in the Tenasserim town, and spent time in his newly acquired region.

The kingdom of Martaban was now truly independent. The rest of the reign was peaceful. He faced no internal or external threats. The king died shortly after in September 1323; he was 39. He was succeeded by his younger brother Saw Zein.

Family
Saw O had a son and a daughter with May Hnin Htapi: Saw E and May Hnin Aw-Kanya.

Notes

References

Bibliography
 
 
 
 
 

Hanthawaddy dynasty
1284 births
1323 deaths
14th-century Burmese monarchs